Unión de Tula is a town and municipality, in the Sierra de Amula region of the state of Jalisco in central-western Mexico.

As of 2005, the municipality had a total population of 13,133.

Population
The average population to this day is 13,133 citizens, which includes about 6,214 males and 6,919 females. About 4,822 people of this population are minors, 8,311 are adults, and 2,001 of these adults are over 60 years old.

History
Tula is referred to either Tula or Tvla because of the last names of the founders. Topete, Villaseñor, Lazcano and Arreola. Tula was conquered by Francisco Cortes of San Buenaventura in 1524. Later in 1872 a new construction began and there was a second parish church. Before this region was conquered by the Spanish it was populated by indigenous tribes. These tribes depended on Amollan Manor or Amula. Amollan Manor or Amula were like leaders to these people could rely on that had no idea where they were, or what to do there.

Housing
About 3,416 homes are registered in Union de Tula, 3,391 are congeneric to normal homes or apartments. Of these, 177 do not have a floor, and 39 have only one room. The economy situation in Tula is bad only 450 homes have their own computer, 2,544 own a washing machine and 3,237 homes have at least one or more televisions. Out of all 3,416 homes 3,212 homes have sanitary installations, 3,283 are connected to the public water supply, and 3,331 have access to electricity.

Government

Municipal presidents

Sightseeing
Some places you can visit are Camino a Santa Ana, which is a little road the most people run on for exercise, because cars rarely pass by there. There is also “El Tepehuaje” which is somewhat like a park. El Tepehuaje has many trees and it even has a soccer field for kids to enjoy and it also has a great view.

References

External links
 

Municipalities of Jalisco